Deine Mariner (born 25 April 2003) is a New Zealand professional rugby league footballer who plays as a  for the Brisbane Broncos in the National Rugby League (NRL).

Background
Mariner's father, Lapi, is a musician. Mariner's background is of Samoan and American Samoan, Tongan and Dutch descent. Mariner was selected for the Australian Schoolboys team in 2021; however, due to COVID-19, no matches were played.

Career

2022
Mariner made his first grade debut for Brisbane against Wests Tigers in round 20 of the 2022 NRL season.

References

External links
Brisbane Broncos profile

New Zealand sportspeople of Samoan descent
New Zealand people of American Samoan descent
New Zealand people of Tuvaluan descent
New Zealand people of Tokelauan descent
New Zealand rugby league players
Brisbane Broncos players
Rugby league centres
Living people
2003 births